B'z TV Style Songless version is the first compilation album by the Japanese rock duo B'z. It is a karaoke compilation with instrumentals only. The album sold 231,340 copies in total, reaching #2 at Oricon.

Track listing 
 - 3:51
Kimi no Naka de Odoritai (君の中で踊りたい) - 3:45
Oh!Girl - 4:11
Rosy - 4:55
Bad Communication - 7:23
Tonari de Nemurasete (となりでねむらせて) - 4:14
Be There - 4:14
Taiyou no Komachi Angel - (太陽のKomachi Angel) - 4:11
Easy Come, Easy Go! - 4:41
Itoshii Hitoyo Good Night... (愛しい人よGood Night...)- 6:16
Hot Fashion - 4:13
Lady Navigation - 4:21
Kodoku no Runaway (孤独のRunaway) - 5:03
Alone - 5:58

References 

B'z compilation albums
1992 compilation albums